Teargas was a South African musical ensemble comprising K.O and  brothers, Ntukza and Ma-E.  The trio officially emerged in post-2004, signed a recording deal with Electromode Music and released debut studio album K’shubile K’bovu (2006).

History 
The trio met at Vaal Triangle Technikon in Vanderbijl park K.O ( born Ntokozo  Mdluli),  Ma-E ( born Ezee Hanabe), and Ntukza ( born Bantu  Hanabe) and signed a record deal with Electro Mode in 2005. Their  debut studio album K’shubile K’bovu was released in July 2006 to critical acclaim. The  album produced a single "Chance", which was nominated for Song of the Year at the 2007 South African Music Awards. Teargas second  album Wafa Wafa was released on May 15, 2008. The album was fused  with Kwaito  elements  and won Best Rap Album at 2008 South African Music Awards.

Their third studio album Dark and Blue was released in 2009 and became certified gold with sales of 25,000 units in South Africa. The album was nominated for Album of the Year at 16th Annual South African Music Awards.

In 2010, the group was nominated for Best International Act at Bet Awards.

Discography

Awards and nominations

References

External links 

 

South African musical groups
South African hip hop groups
South African boy bands
People from Mpumalanga
People from Gauteng